Water Valley is an unincorporated community in Tom Green County, Texas, United States. According to the Handbook of Texas, the community had an estimated population of 120 in 2000. The community is part of the San Angelo, Texas metropolitan statistical area.

Geography
Water Valley is situated along U.S. Highway 87 in northern Tom Green County, about 22 miles northwest of San Angelo and 64 miles southeast of Big Spring.

History
Among the early are settlers was Captain William Turner, who arrived around 1878. He established the Whitbarrow Ranch and built a stone house that later served as a rest home for soldiers during World War II. The community was founded by two men known as Phelin and Glynn. They dammed the North Concho River and dug an irrigation ditch that opened up the area to settlers, most of whom were English immigrants. From 1885 to 1888, the local post office was known as Yandell, Argenta, or Stella. It was known as Rethaville, Mayes Store, or Mayesville from 1888 to 1889. The community was renamed Water Valley in 1889. By 1914, Water Valley had a population of 175, a general store, a gin, and two cotton buyers. Around the same time, the Water Valley Independent School District was formed. The number of residents stood at 140 in 1940. That figure peaked at 180 in the mid-1950s, before declining to around 120 during the later half of the 20th century.

Although Water Valley is unincorporated, it has a post office, with the ZIP code of 76958.

Education
Public education in Water Valley is provided by the Water Valley Independent School District. The district covers northwestern Tom Green and southwestern Coke Counties. Water Valley High School fields teams in basketball, football, volleyball, and tennis. The Pride of Water Valley Band and FFA chapter are also staples in the community.  The school website is www.wvisd.net.

References
 Population 100–1,000

External links

Unincorporated communities in Tom Green County, Texas
Unincorporated communities in Texas
San Angelo, Texas metropolitan area